Torre Pallavicina is a comune (municipality) in the Province of Bergamo in the Italian region of Lombardy, located about  east of Milan and about  southeast of Bergamo.  

Torre Pallavicina borders the following municipalities: Fontanella, Orzinuovi, Pumenengo, Roccafranca, Soncino.

References